Painda is a village in the Attock District of Punjab, Pakistan, located about 64 km (40 mi) north-west of Islamabad. Painda is a populated place (class P - Populated Place) based on the region font code of Asia/Pacific. It is located at an elevation of 285 meters above sea level. The village has a long yet uncertain history, however, it has been confirmed that people arrived in Painda with Mahmud of Ghazni when he invaded the Indian subcontinent.

History 
The two major tribes of Painda are Arain and Awan. Although some Awans are considered locals, the majority of them originally come from nearby villages like Kamulpur Musa. The third most populous tribe is the Tharkhan, which originated from the village of Daman. The village's economy is primarily agriculture-based. Some villagers now live abroad in places like Hong Kong, the United States, and Saudi Arabia. There are 8 mosques in the village. There are two primary schools: one for boys and one for girls. There is a madrassa under the supervision of Hafiz Haqniwaz Sahib, which provides religious education to students from all over Pakistan. Including some of those who completed Hifz from Afghanistan. The major language of Painda is Hindku, but some people also speak Pushto.village painda is located at this place since 400 years before that it was situated  near Bank of Indus River about 800 hundred  years  but according  to history a Village was there before 20 bc at same place.

References 

Villages in Attock District